A pound-foot (lb⋅ft), abbreviated from pound-force foot (lbf · ft), is a unit of torque representing one pound of force acting at a perpendicular distance of one foot from a pivot point. Conversely one foot pound-force (ft · lbf) is the moment about an axis that applies one pound-force at a radius of one foot.  

The value in SI units is given by multiplying the following exact factors:

One pound (mass) = 

Standard gravity = 9.80665 m/s2

One foot = 0.3048 m

This gives the exact conversion factor:

One pound-foot =  newton metres.

The name "pound-foot", intended to minimize confusion with the foot-pound as a unit of work, was apparently first proposed by British physicist Arthur Mason Worthington. 

Despite this, in practice torque units are commonly called the foot-pound (denoted as either lb-ft or ft-lb) or the inch-pound (denoted as in-lb).  Practitioners depend on context and the hyphenated abbreviations to know that these refer to neither energy nor moment of mass (as the symbol ft-lb rather than lbf-ft would imply).

It is commonly used on torque wrenches and torque screwdrivers for setting specific fastener tension.

References

Units of torque
Imperial units
Customary units of measurement in the United States

de:Foot-pound